SABC 2 is a South African family public television channel owned by the South African Broadcasting Corporation (SABC). SABC 2 broadcasts programming in English, Afrikaans, Venda, and Tsonga.

As of August 2018, the channel started broadcasting in high definition.

History
SABC began trialling its first television service on 5 May 1975 in South Africa's largest cities, and officially launched its first television channel on 6 January 1976 under the name SABC Television/SAUK-Televisie. On 1 January 1981, it changed its name to TV1, with the launch of two new services: TV2 broadcasting in Zulu and Xhosa and TV3 broadcasting in Sotho and Tswana, both targeted at a Black urban audience and broadcasting on the same television frequency. The main network, now called TV1, divided its broadcasting languages evenly between English and Afrikaans, as before. In 1986, a new service called TV4 was introduced, carrying sports and entertainment programming, also timesharing with TV2 and TV3 on the same frequency, which stopped broadcasting at 9:30pm.

In 1991, TV2, TV3 and TV4 were merged into a new full-fledged network, CCV (Contemporary Community Values). A separate network was introduced, TopSport Surplus (TSS), with TopSport being the brand name for the SABC's sport coverage. However, it was replaced by NNTV (National Network TV), an educational non-commercial channel in 1994. 
In 1996, the SABC reorganised its three TV networks with the aim of making them more representative of the various language groups. These were renamed to SABC 1 (formerly CCV), SABC 2 (formerly TV1) and SABC 3 (formerly NNTV). The amount of time allocated to Afrikaans-language programming on the new channel (SABC 2) fell from 50% to 15% - a move that alienated Afrikaans speakers.

Programming 
After the SABC restructured its television channels, SABC 2 took the place of the old TV1 channel. The reduced prominence of Afrikaans angered many speakers of the language, although the channel still features a significant amount of Afrikaans programming, including a news broadcast every week night at 19:00 and weekends at 18:00.

M-Net seeing the market need, launched the Afrikaans subscription channel KykNet in 1999 and followed in 2005 with the music channel MK (originally known as MK89.) In 2009, M-Net launched Koowee, a kids channel broadcasting in Afrikaans.

Soapies, dramas and telenovelas 
The channel is popular for its two longest-running soapies 7de Laan and Muvhango, dramas such as Erfsonders, Gerramtes in die Kas, Roer Jouy Voete and 90 Plein Street, and Telenovelas such as Keeping Score, Giyani: Land of Blood and Die Senturm.

Series 
SABC 2 has in the past, broadcast international series such as NCIS, Pretty Little Liars, Teen Wolf and The Vampire Diaries. However, the channel is currently focused on local reality and actuality series such as Speak Out, Relate, and Saving Our Marriage, comedies such as Ga Re Dumele and Ke Ba Bolleletse, and a few international series such as American Ninja Warrior.

Talk and magazine 
The channel has a small number of talk, travel and magazine shows. Shows include Motswako, Vusaseki, Nhlalala ya Rixaka, 50/50, Voetspore and TalkAbility.

Music 
SABC 2 plays local afro-soul and pop music interludes in between shows. It also has music shows such as Afro Cafè, Soul'd Out Sessions, Kliphard, Musiek Roulette and Noot vir Noot.

Religion 
The channel has religious shows aimed at Christianity, Judaism and Hinduism. Local shows include longest running show It's Gospel Time, Gospel Classics, Psalted ["Simcha"], Derech Erets, and Issues of Faith.

Sports 
SABC 2 rarely broadcasts live sports due to funding issues, and instead focuses on sporting highlights. It is mostly focused on boxing, rugby, swimming and athletics.

News and current affairs 
The channel provides three primetime bulletins for the TshiVenda/xiTsonga, Afrikaans, and Sotho/Setswana/Sepedi languages. In addition, it has current affairs programmes including Fokus, Ngula Ya Vutivi, Zwa Maramani and Leihlo La Sechaba. It also airs the longest-running breakfast show Morning Live. It is known for national events such as presidential inaugurations, State of the Nation Address, Budget Speeches, and parliamentary events.

Movies 
The channel is known for family-friendly and dramatic movies, autobiographies and animated movies.

Youth and education 

SABC 2 has a roster of shows from its SABC Education slate, most notably Takalani Sesame, It's For Life, The Epic Hangout,among others, and also brings educational shows on how to manage money and a focus on senior citizens, as well as other children's shows from Disney Junior, either in their original English soundtrack or dubbed in South African languages, such as The Lion Guard in isiZulu, Ben 10 in Afrikaans and Doc McStuffins in Sotho. For teens and preteens it offers comedy series from Disney Channel and Nickelodeon, such as ICarly, True Jackson, VP, A.N.T. Farm, Sanjay and Craig, The Sparticle Mystery, Star Falls and Cookabout, as well as local series including Signal High, Snake Park and Hectic Nine-9. Content that is most watched among the youth is the 17:00 slot, for airing anime series from Toei Animation, Studio Pierrot and TV Tokyo, notably airing popular series that have a cult following such as Yu-Gi-Oh!, Yu-Gi-Oh! GX, Yu-Gi-Oh! 5D's, Yu-Gi-Oh! ARC-V, Beyblade, Dragon Ball, Dragon Ball Z, Dragon Ball Z Kai, Dragon Ball GT, Dragon Ball SUPER, Naruto Shippuden, One Piece and Bleach.

See also 
 List of South African media
 List of South African television channels

References

External links

Television stations in South Africa
Television channels and stations established in 1996
Afrikaans-language television